Denilson da Costa (born 7 March 1998) is a Mozambican swimmer. He competed in the men's 50 metre butterfly event at the 2017 World Aquatics Championships.

References

External links
 

1998 births
Living people
Mozambican male butterfly swimmers
Commonwealth Games competitors for Mozambique
Swimmers at the 2018 Commonwealth Games
Place of birth missing (living people)
Swimmers at the 2015 African Games
African Games competitors for Mozambique
Sportspeople from Maputo